Jeff Case (born 24 November 1990) is a New Zealand cricketer. He made his first-class debut for Canterbury in the 2017–18 Plunket Shield season on 25 March 2018. He made his List A debut for Canterbury in the 2018–19 Ford Trophy on 10 November 2018.

References

External links
 

1990 births
Living people
New Zealand cricketers
Canterbury cricketers
Place of birth missing (living people)